Sucker Creek is a stream in the U.S. state of Minnesota. It is a tributary of the Crow River.

Sucker Creek was so named for its population of suckerfish.

See also
List of rivers of Minnesota

References

Rivers of Meeker County, Minnesota
Rivers of Wright County, Minnesota
Rivers of Minnesota